Liz Mills is an Australian basketball coach who has coached elite level men's club, national university and national men's basketball teams in Africa since 2011, Mills is currently the head coach of ABC Fighters of the Basketball Africa League (BAL).   

She is the first female basketball head coach to lead a men's national team at a FIBA continental championship, as well as the first-ever female head coach in the Basketball Africa League (BAL) after debuting in 2022. She is also the first female head coach of a men's club team in Morocco, and in the Arab world.  

Mills began her coaching career in Sydney, in 2002 working with juniors and senior women's teams. Since 2011, Mills has been a head coach and assistant coach in Africa of senior men's club teams, national men's university teams and national men's teams.

In 2021, Mills was the head coach of the Kenyan men's national team,  becoming the only woman in the world at that time in charge of a men's national team not only in basketball but in any major sport. She is the first and only female head coach in a men's continental championship (Pan-Africa Afrobasket) since the International Basketball Federation FIBA was founded in 1932, when she coached Kenya at AfroBasket 2021.

Coaching career
Mills began her coaching career in Sydney, Australia in 2002 whilst at Willoughby Girls High School. She has coached junior boys and girls club and representative teams for Northern (Sydney) Suburbs Basketball Association (NSBA), as well as senior women's representative teams at Norths. 

Whilst in Australia she completed an undergraduate degree in Sports Science and Sports Management (2008) at the University of Technology Sydney (UTS) and in 2014 completed a Masters of Education in Sports Coaching at the University of Sydney (USYD).    

Since 2011 Mills has been a head coach and assistant coach in Africa of top league men's club teams, national men's university teams and national men's teams. 

Prior to 2011, Mills had never coached men. Mills started her coaching career in Africa in Zambia, where she was the head coach for Zambia's senior men's national league team Heroes Play United during the 2011-2012 season and guided them to a national championship win. She went on to win another national title in Zambia's senior men's league in 2015/2016 as head coach of team Matero Magic. Whilst coaching in Zambia, Mills was also named as head coach for the Zambian men's national university team. This team competed in the 2012 CUCSA Zone VI University Games, finishing second and competed in All Africa University Games (FASU) later that year where they finished third. 

At the club level, Mills worked with the Rwandan top league men's club team Patriots BBC for the 2019 pan-Africa Basketball Africa League Qualifiers. She led the team to the East Division Qualification Title, with the team going undefeated in the two rounds of qualifiers. The team went on to compete in the 2021 Basketball Africa League.   

Having served as assistant coach of the national Zambia for  the 2017 Afrobasket Zone VI qualifiers and Cameroon men's basketball teams for 2019 FIBA World Cup African Qualifiers, Mills joined the Kenyan Morans as Head Coach in January 2021. She steered Kenya to qualifying for their first AfroBasket championship in 28 years, after beating 11-time African champions Angola 74-73 in Cameroon in February 2021 at the 2021 FIBA AfroBasket Qualifiers. Previously Kenya had never beaten Angola. As head coach of the Morans at the 2021 FIBA Afrobasket Mills led Kenya to a 1-3 record. Kenya defeated Mali to pick up their first win at an AfroBasket and for the first time progressed past the first round group stage.

Basketball Africa League (2022–present) 
On February 12, 2022, she was announced as head coach by AS Salé a club in the Division Excellence, the top professional men's league in Morocco. Mills was the first female head coach of men's team in Morocco and the Arab world, In March 2022, Mills became the first female head coach of a men's team in the Basketball Africa League. She left the team in May, as she was looking for a role on a national team.

On December 2, 2022, Mills signed for Ivorian team ABC Fighters, who earlier qualified for the 2023 BAL season.

Personal
Mills grew up in Sydney with a passion for coaching basketball since an early age. She and her identical twin sister, Vik, grew up playing multiple sports such as netball, tennis, athletics and swimming. With Vik, she started playing basketball at the age of 15. Mills took her first basketball coaching position at age 16, on many occasions co-coaching with her sister Vik.

Head coaching record

BAL

|-
| style="text-align:left;"|AS Salé
| style="text-align:left;"|2022
| 5||3||2|||| style="text-align:left;"|3rd in Sahara Conference||1||0||1||
| style="text-align:center;"|Lost in Quarterfinals
|- class="sortbottom"

Global Women In Basketball Coaching Network 
In August 2022 Mills launched the Global Women In Basketball Coaching Network via Facebook. Co-founded with her twin sister Vic, the network is the first international network for female basketball coaches. The mission of the network is to connect female coaches from around the world on a platform where they can engage, empower, and elevate each other to success.

References

External links
 Eurobasket.com profile

Living people
Australian men's basketball coaches
Australian women's basketball coaches
Sportspeople from Sydney
Australian expatriate sportspeople in Cameroon
Australian expatriate sportspeople in Kenya
Australian expatriate sportspeople in Morocco
Australian expatriate sportspeople in Zambia
Australian twins
Year of birth missing (living people)
Basketball Africa League coaches